Karna Kadur (born 24 June 1988 in Bangalore, India) is an Indian National Rally Champion. He began with road racing and also achieved immense success in Indian rallying with seven National rally titles in different classes. He won two Overall National Rally Championship victories 2016 and 2022 with Arka Motorsports. He is with Arka Motorsports and drives in MRF Tyres colours under the mentorship of N Leelakrishnan, his engineer and tuner. He is also the first driver to get a National Championship title for Volkswagen Polo.

Motorsport career 
Karna was given his first taste of motorsport in a Motocross bike at the age of six. He began participating in local Motocross events at the age of nine. His parents Prakash Kadur (former Indian rally champion) and Nirmala Prakash were instrumental in showing support in his career. Later Karna moved on to Go-Karting Championship events and eventually made his way to the National racing championship where he drove the Formula Rolon series till 2006. In 2009, Karna took a short break after suffering a shock loss in his family and returned with rallying as a privateer in his first outing.

In the same year, Karna was selected through Red Rooster Racing's Talent Identification Program by N.Leelakrishnan and went on to win the Rally Star cup championship. He was the Motorsports Manager and development driver with Red Rooster Performance in 2009.

In 2010, Karna was promoted as the team's fourth driver in a Mitsubishi Group N Cedia. He was also the Driving Instructor at Red Rooster Performance Motorsports Academy. However, Red Rooster Racing pulled out of motorsports citing lack of sponsorship at the end of the season.

In 2011, Karna participated as a privateer supported by Red Rooster Performance and went on to win his first national title in the Group N Indian National Rally championship.

In 2012, Karna finished 1st runner up in the overall Indian National Rally Championship driving a Mitsubishi Group N Cedia prepared by N.Leelakrishnan of Red Rooster Performance.

In 2014, Karna was the stand-in driver for Team Mahindra Adventure.

In 2015, Karna was brought in as the second driver at Team Yokohama India. He partnered with an International Co-Driver Vivek Ponnusamy from Australia. He went on to drive a Group N Volkswagen Polo prepared by N.Leelakrishnan of Red Rooster Performance. The pair won the 1600 Group N championship.

Team Yokohama India had fielded a car each in the INRC 2000 & INRC 1600 categories. A Volkswagen Polo driven by Karna and co-driven by Nikhil V. Pai in the INRC 1600 and a Mitsubishi Cedia driven by Rahul Kantharaj and Vivek Bhat in the INRC 2000. Both the cars were prepared by N.Leelakrishnan of Red Rooster Performance.
Their victory helped Team Yokohama India to secure the Team Championship in the group N 1600 and 2000 respectively for the first time since its inception.

In 2016, was the turnaround year in Karna's career. Still driving for Team Yokohama, he partnered with the country's most experienced co-driver, Nikhil V. Pai. Karna's co-Driver Nikhil V. Pai happens to have over 35 years of motorsport experience as well as having co-driven for the top drivers in the country since the early 1980s. Team Yokohama India had fielded two cars in the INRC 2000, a Volkswagen Polo driven by Karna and co-driven by Nikhil and a Mitsubishi Cedia driven by Rahul Kantharaj and Vivek Bhat. Both the cars were prepared by N.Leelakrishnan 
of Red Rooster Performance

While the team's primary goal was to secure yet another subcategory national title, the surprise was indeed in store. At the first rally in Coimbatore Karna suffered an electrical issue during the rally and had to be content with finishing 3rd in the INRC 2000 and Overall 4th. Tragically after the scrutiny of the rally, the rally car on its way back to the base, caught fire and was gutted. With the next round in 3 weeks at Nasik and no time to source, a new car The Team at Red Rooster Performance managed to put the same car back together under the parts support from Volkswagen Motorsports India. Karna did not disappoint his team's efforts and secured a well fought second place in Nasik having just lost by 1 second and in the third round in Rally De North even managed to defeat the mightier Mahindra's XUV's to finish an overall second to the Volkswagen Polo R2 spec of Arjun Rao. Next up at the season's 4th round at Coffee Day India Rally - an Asia Pacific Rally Championship as well, Karna and co-driver Nikhil dominated the event and went on to win the Overall National Championship by finishing an overall first with still a round to spare at Bangalore the following month. This is Volkswagen Polo's first overall rally victory in the country after 4 years of its inception in this field. Also, this being a group N spec car it proved to be mightier than the more powerful cars in the field for the 2016 season.

As of 2017, Karna is back, participating in the MRF FMSCI Indian National Rally Championship, along with co-driver Nikhil Pai, as the defending title champion driver and placed second overall and first in the INRC 2 Class at the Rally of Coimbatore.

References

1988 births
Living people
Indian racing drivers
Indian rally drivers